In the context of nuclear reactors, a safety code is a computer program used to analyze the safety of a reactor, or to simulate possible accident conditions.

See also 
 Monte Carlo N-Particle Transport Code

External links 
 NRC Computer Codes for Safety Analysis 
 Nuclear Plant Safety Codes

Nuclear energy
Nuclear technology
Power station technology
Nuclear accidents and incidents
Nuclear safety and security